Pachanottukal is a 1973 Indian Malayalam-language film, directed by A. B. Raj and produced by K. P. Kottarakkara. The film stars Prem Nazir, Vijayasree, Adoor Bhasi and Jose Prakash. The film had musical score by M. K. Arjunan.

Cast

Prem Nazir as Paulose
Vijayasree as Leelamma
Adoor Bhasi as Thommi Aashaan
Jose Prakash as Mathews Muthalali
Prema as Lovelamma
Sankaradi
Paul Vengola as Lonappi
C. R. Lakshmi as Shoshamma
Kaduvakulam Antony as Puluvan Thoma
Khadeeja as Mariamma
Kottarakkara Sreedharan Nair as Rappael
Leela as Lalitha
N. Govindankutty as Anthappan
Radhamani as Monimma
Rani Chandra as Rosey
Sadhana

Soundtrack
The music was composed by M. K. Arjunan with lyrics by Sreekumaran Thampi.

References

External links
 

1973 films
1970s Malayalam-language films